Tannen is surname of:
 Biff Tannen, a character in the Back to the Future trilogy
 Val Tannen (born 1953), Professor of Computer Science at the University of Pennsylvania 
 Charles Tannen (1915–1980), American actor
 Deborah Tannen (born 1945), American academic and professor of linguistics
 Julius Tannen (1880–1965), comedian and father of Charles and William Tannen
  (1827–1904), German publisher and writer
 Steve Tannen (born 1968), American singer-songwriter
 Steven Olson Tannen (born 1948), American college and professional football player
 William Tannen

See also 
 Lake Tannen

German-language surnames